Derek Lin is a Taiwanese-American author in the Tao genre.

Lin translated the Tao Te Ching and annotated it. His translation is published by Skylight Paths Publishing in 2006.

Lin is also the author of four books published by the Tarcher imprint of the Penguin Group: The Tao of Daily life, The Tao of Success, The Tao of Joy Every Day and The Tao of Happiness, as well as two independently published books: The Tao of Wisdom and The Tao of Tranquility.

Philanthropy
Lin offers his books to incarcerated individuals in the United States free of charge.

See also

 Taoism
 Tao Te Ching
 Chuang Tzu

Bibliography
Books by Derek Lin

 Tao Te Ching: Annotated & Explained. Skylight Paths; 2006. .
 The Tao of Daily Life. Tarcher; 2007. .
 The Tao of Success: The Five Ancient Rings of Destiny. Tarcher; 2010. .
 The Tao of Joy Every Day: 365 Days of Tao Living. Tarcher; 2011. .
 The Tao of Happiness: Stories from Chuang Tzu for Your Spiritual Journey. Tarcher; 2015. .
 The Tao of Wisdom: Ancient Stories Bringing the Tao Te Ching to Life. Independent; 2021. .
 The Tao of Tranquility: The Wisdom of Lao Tzu and the Buddha - Qingjing Jing. Independent; 2021. .

Films
 With One Voice (2009)
 Eastern Mystics (2011)

Awards
 The Tao of Success - 2011 COVR Award for Best in Print - Spirituality Category
 The Tao of Daily Life - 2008 COVR Award for Best Book - Spirituality Category
 The Tao of Daily Life - 2008 Nautilus Book Awards Silver Winner - Spirituality Category

References

External links
Official Website
Taoism.net
Tao Meeting
Facebook - Derek Lin Books
Facebook - Tao Talks with Derek Lin
YouTube - Tao Talks with Derek Lin
With One Voice documentary on Vimeo
With One Voice documentary on IMDB
Eastern Mystics documentary
The Tao of Success - 2011 Award for Best in Print - Spirituality Category
The Tao of Daily Life - 2008 Award for Best Book - Spirituality Category
The Tao of Daily Life - 2008 Nautilus Book Awards Silver Winner - Spirituality Category

Chinese spiritual writers
Chinese Taoists
Living people
1964 births
Taiwanese writers
Taiwanese Taoists
American people of Taiwanese descent
American writers of Chinese descent
American Taoists